Gazani-ye Pain (also Romanized as Gazānī-ye Pā’īn; also known as Gazānī-ye Mīrān) is a village in Polan Rural District, Polan District, Chabahar County, Sistan and Baluchestan Province, Iran. At the 2006 census, its population was 223, in 35 families.

References 

Populated places in Chabahar County